Boden is a surname. Notable people with the surname include: 

Alana Boden (born 1997), English actress
Alec Boden (1925–2011), Scottish footballer
Anna Boden (born 1976), American filmmaker
Anne Boden (born 1960), Welsh tech entrepreneur and founder of Starling Bank
Andrew Boden (died 1835), American politician
Brigid Boden, Irish singer
Bob Boden (born 1959), American television producer
Falk Boden (born 1960), German cyclist
Fernand Boden (born 1943), politician from Luxembourg
Jens Boden (born 1978), German speed skater
Johnnie Boden (born 1961), English entrepreneur, founder of Boden catalogue clothing company
Jon Boden (born 1977) English musician and folk singer
Joseph Boden (died 1811), founder of the Boden Professorship of Sanskrit at Oxford University
Josh Boden (born 1986), Canadian football player
Luke Boden (born 1988), English footballer
Lynn Boden (born 1953), American football player
Margaret Boden (born 1936), British artificial intelligence researcher
Margarete Himmler, née Boden (1893-1967), wife of SS chief Heinrich Himmler
Patrik Bodén (born 1967), Swedish javelin thrower
Ron Boden (1936-2015), Australian rugby footballer
Samuel Boden (1826–1882), English chess master
Scott Boden (born 1989), English footballer

German-language surnames
Occupational surnames